The 2024 AFC U-23 Asian Cup qualification is an international men's under-23 football competition which decided the participating teams of the 2024 AFC U-23 Asian Cup.

A total of 16 teams will qualify to play in the final tournament, including Qatar who qualified automatically as hosts country.

Format changes
The AFC Executive Committee had approved several strategic recommendations put forward by the AFC Competitions Committee. One of which was the removal of zoning principles in the AFC's youth competitions.

Draw
All of the 47 AFC member associations, including the final tournament hosts Qatar are eligible for entering the qualifiers.

The teams are seeded according to their performance in the 2022 AFC U-23 Asian Cup final tournament and qualification (overall ranking shown in parentheses). The teams which indicate their intention to serve as qualification group hosts prior to the draw will be drawn into separate groups.

Notes
Teams in bold qualified for the final tournament.
(H): Qualification group hosts determined before the draw
(H)*: Qualification group hosts determined after the draw
(Q): Final tournament hosts, automatically qualified regardless of qualification results
(W): Withdrew after draw
(N): Not a member of the International Olympic Committee, ineligible for Olympics

Qualified teams
The following teams qualified for the 2024 AFC U-23 Asian Cup.

See also
2024 AFC Women's Olympic Qualifying Tournament
2024 AFC U-20 Women's Asian Cup qualification
2024 AFC U-17 Women's Asian Cup qualification

References

Qualification
AFC U-23 Championship qualification
U-23 Asian Cup qualification
2023 in youth association football
March 2023 sports events in Asia